King's Island is an area of central Limerick, Ireland. The area is often referred to colloquially as The Island and consists of two distinct areas, Englishtown and St Mary's Park. The historical city of Limerick known as Englishtown is located on the southern end and St Mary's Park; a local authority housing estate is located on the northern end.

The island is formed from a distributary of the River Shannon. The Abbey River diverts from the Shannon before meeting it again at a confluence near the Potato Market.

The island probably took its name after the 13th-century English King John's Castle was built. However, a 150AD map by Ptolemy shows a place called 'Regia' at the same site as King's Island, and history suggests the presence of earlier settlements in the area. The island's location offers an ideal defensive position at a natural river crossing.

Englishtown

In times past, the ancient city of Limerick itself was entirely contained in the area now known as Englishtown as a walled city. The Vikings established the city in this area following the Viking Invasion of Ireland. After the Norman Invasion of Ireland, the city was taken by Norman or Old English settlers. It is from this time that the area became referred to as Englishtown and also to distinguish it from Irishtown south of the Abbey River which was populated by native Irish. It was during the Norman Conquest that many of the city's landmarks were built in this district such as the 13th century King John's Castle and the 800-year-old St Mary's Cathedral. Nicholas Street and Mary Street on the island formed the medieval city centre of Limerick and are perhaps the oldest streets in the city. Samuel Lewis writing in 1837 in his Topographical Dictionary of Ireland describes Limerick's old city of Englishtown as resembling the city of Rouen, Normandy with the housing built in Flemish fashion. Even by then though there is evidence the district was in decline as he describes the area as exhibiting a 'dirty & neglected appearance'. Following the development of Newtown Pery the city centre shifted south to the present day centre of the city and the Englishtown area lost its position as the fashionable area of the city. By the late 18th Century the old continental style cramped lofty Dutch & Flemish houses that once characterised the area were transformed into tenements and rented to Limerick's poorest. Englishtown became characterised by poverty, slum living and squalor. All of the slums were cleared in the early to mid 20th Century, resulting in the loss of most of the areas historical built heritage such as the collection of Flemish townhouses, Ireton's Castle, the Exchange building, the Tholsel amongst much more. Many buildings and shops in the area remain derelict or in deteriorating conditions today.

St Mary's Park

St Mary's Park is a local authority housing estate located on the northern part of the island known as the Island Field. As one of the most deprived areas in Limerick city, it is earmarked as part of the overall Limerick city regeneration project which will see the estate replanned and rebuilt with greater integration to the city.

Landmarks

As the most historic and ancient part of Limerick, King's Island and the Englishtown area contains many notable buildings and landmarks such as:

 King John's Castle, Castle Street, dates from the 13th Century
 St Mary's Cathedral, Bridge Street, dates from the 14th Century
 Old Bishop's Palace, (now headquarters of Limerick Civic Trust), Castle Street, c1750
 St Munchin's Church (now the Island Theatre Company), Church Street, c1825
 Villier's Almhouses, Verdant Place, c1820
 (Royal) Military Cemetery, King's Island, which dates from 1856
 Bourke's Castle, Athlunkard Street
 Fanning's Castle, Mary Street, c1641
 City Courthouse, Merchants Quay, c1800
 Barrington's Hospital, George's Quay
 St Mary's Roman Catholic Church, Athlunkard Street
 Exchange Walls (formerly the Exchange Building), Nicholas Street
 Ruins of the old Dominican Friary, Bishop Street
 Limerick City Hall & Civic Buildings, Merchants Quay
 Baal's Bridge dates from 1830 replacing an earlier structure (which connected Irishtown to Englishtown in medieval times). The bridge is also known for the Baal's Bridge Square. When the new bridge was constructed in 1830 an old brass square of Freemasonry symbolism was found in the foundations of the original bridge with a date inscribed to 1517. The Square is reputed to be one of the earliest Masonic items found in the world.

See also
History of Limerick City
Limerick
History of Ireland
Ireland
King John of England
Limerick City Museum

References

Limerick (city)
River islands of Ireland
Islands of County Limerick